The Girl from Nowhere is a 1921 American silent drama film directed by George Archainbaud and starring Elaine Hammerstein, William B. Davidson and Huntley Gordon.

Cast
 Elaine Hammerstein as 	Mavis Cole
 William B. Davidson as Jimmy Ryder
 Huntley Gordon as Herbert Whitman
 Louise Prussing as Dorothy Grosscup
 Colin Campbell as Samuel Grosscup
 Al Stewart as 	Steve La Marche
 Warren Cook as Judge Cole
 Vera Conroy as Grace Parker

References

Bibliography
 Connelly, Robert B. The Silents: Silent Feature Films, 1910-36, Volume 40, Issue 2. December Press, 1998.
 Munden, Kenneth White. The American Film Institute Catalog of Motion Pictures Produced in the United States, Part 1. University of California Press, 1997.

External links
 

1921 films
1921 drama films
1920s English-language films
American silent feature films
Silent American drama films
American black-and-white films
Films directed by George Archainbaud
Selznick Pictures films
1920s American films